Rail transport in Madagascar is primarily operated by Madarail. The northern railway (TCE,  Tananarive–Côte Est) is currently concessioned to Maragall. The southern line, Fianarantsoa-Côte-Est railway (FCE), is a parastatal (state owned) line.

History
Construction started in 1901 on the Madagascar Railway (Le Chemin-de-Fer de Madagascar) from Tananarive to Ambatolampy. The full line was completed from Tananarive to Antsirabe in 1923.

Operations

There is a regular (at least daily) goods traffic between the port city of Toamasina and the capital city of Antananarivo. There are daily passenger trains on the Madarail system. Very occasionally there are special chartered trips on restored Micheline railcars for tourists. The southern line has a regular daily passenger train, which provides a slow but picturesque alternative to the recently rehabilitated road in the region.

Interfaces
 Continuous Brakes: Air/Vacuum/Unbraked ?
 Couplers: Centre buffer and two side hooks and chains.

Cities served by rail

 Antananarivo - national capital
 Toamasina - chief seaport

Expansion plans
Talks are going for extending Madagascar Railway operated by Madarail. The Malagasy Government signed a pact with Indian Railways & South African Railways to extend their railway services up to Antsiranana, Antalaha & Andapa in the north, up to Mahajanga & Maintirano in the west. Again southwest, south & southeastern extension of Fianarantsoa - Manakara Railway Line up to Morondova, Morombe, Toliara & Tolanaro is being planned. After extension, the length of the Madagascar Railway operated by Madarail will stand at  connecting all of Madagascar.

See also

 Economy of Madagascar
 History of rail transport in Madagascar
 Transport in Madagascar

References

Notes

Further reading

External links 

 UN map
 Interactive map of Madagascar railway system